Eha Amufu is a town in Enugu State, Nigeria. It is located in Isi Uzo Local Government Area.

A couple of decades ago,, it was one of the touchstones of Eastern pride bordering the northern part of the country.

Revellers and long-fatigued train passengers from distant Iddo Terminus Lagos and Kano heading to Enugu, Umuahia and Port Harcourt, often heaved a big sigh of relief when they berth at this first Ibo speaking area.

All trains the most popular then Express Train and later Diesel Train also the local goods train popularly dubbed ‘Subaba Train, amongst others, must make a major stop over and be recharged with tonnes of water. The train station popularised this homogenous and large community, which equally boasted of being haven to tens of hundreds of non-indigenous living peacefully and doing commerce at Eha-Amufu.

In the 1960s and 1970s the town became strategic in many respects. During the pogrom in the north, when Easterners especially Igbos were slaughtered, it was at Eha-Amufu that the Red Cross and authorities of Eastern Region met with returning fleeing easterners and received some decapitated bodies.

At the end of the Biafran War in 1970, Nigerian troops were stationed in the town for years before relocating to Obollo-Afor.

It is also the gateway for drivers plying the north through Obollo-Afor heading to the foremost Nigerian Cement Factory at Nkalagu.
The town has an official post office.

See also

References

 Godwin Aguigbo Junior:(2016) Research on historical event: Problem and Possibilities of Eha-Amufu, Enugu State, Nigeria. 3rd Faculty of Science Distinguished Lecture Series, University of educational planning of Eha-amufu Town, August 8, 2016.

Towns in Enugu State